Jeq or JEQ may refer to:
 Jewellery Quarter railway station, England
 Jump if equal, a branch instruction in computer programming